Hu Ronghua (born 1945), a native of Shanghai, is one of the strongest players of xiangqi, or Chinese chess. In fact, he is often referred to as the Bobby Fischer of Chinese chess.

Xiangqi career 
Hu first won the Chinese National Xiangqi Championship in 1960 at age 15, the youngest record ever.  Hu went on to win the next nine consecutive national championships, which gave him a 10-championship streak from 1960 to 1979. (Due to the Cultural Revolution, the Chinese National Xiangqi Competition was not held annually during that period).

In the 1980s, he won the national championship in 1983 and 1985. By the mid 1990s, people thought that he was past his prime, and that younger generations of top players would eventually replace him. However, he won yet again in 1997 and another in 2000.

Thus, Hu Ronghua holds the record for the greatest number of national titles (14), the youngest champion (age 15 in 1960), and the oldest champion (age 55 in 2000) in the history of xiangqi.

Contributions to the development of xiangqi 
Hu has been advocating for a revival of xiangqi. In 2011, Hu launched a reality show called Let's Play Chess to find a new apprentice.

Hu made great contributions to xiangqi theory, including pioneer work on the elephant opening (飞相局) and the Back-Palace-Knight (反宫马) opening.

The Hu Rule of Xiangqi：Hu devised a new xiangqi rule, that is, the chance of playing black is obtained by auctions of two players. The player who offers less time wins the auction. If the game finally ends in a draw, black wins. The Hu Rule is aimed at eliminating negative draw games and making xiangqi more spectator-friendly. However, the Hu Rule is boycotted by professional players one year upon its birth.

Titles 

 1982: Grandmaster
 1988: International Grandmaster of Chinese Chess.

Publications 

 XIANGQI Grandmaster Hu RongHua and his Elephant Openings (English publication 2017)

Other interests 
Besides xiangqi, Hu also has many other interests. In his early years, he was trained for a short period in weiqi (Go). He also plays a game called daguailuzi(大怪路子)，a popular local game of Shanghai.

References and notes

Xiangqi players
Sportspeople from Shanghai
1945 births
Living people